Cain Southernwood (born ) is a professional rugby league footballer who has played in the 2010s.

He was a member of the Wakefield Trinity Wildcats Academy grand final winning team in 2009, he was selected for the England Academy squad from which the side to face France and Australia was selected.

Bradford Bulls
Southernwood signed for Bradford Bulls mid-2010 from Wakefield Trinity Wildcats on a three-year deal. Statistic do not include pre-season friendlies.

2010
Southerwood made his début against Warrington due to an injury to Matt Orford. He featured in the following game against Castleford, but then wasn't selected for the remainder of the season.

2011
Southernwood featured in three of the four pre-season games. He played against Halifax, Dewsbury and Keighley.  Southernwood was not selected to play in any league or cup matches that season.

2012

Southernwood was sent on a season long loan to Championship side Dewsbury.

Whitehaven

2013
Southernwood signed for Whitehaven for the 2013 Championship season. He scored a try against Keighley Cougars. He kicked three goals against Workington Town and kicked five against Sheffield Eagles. In the Challenge Cup he scored a try and kicked five goals against London Skolars. Southernwood also scored in the Northern Rail Cup against London Skolars. He kicked three goals against Hunslet. He scored two tries and kicked three goals against Sheffield Eagles and also kicked three goals against Leigh. He scored a try against Keighley, Leigh and Swinton Lions.

2014
Southernwood kicked three goals against Keighley Cougars. He then kicked three goals and a drop goal in the win against Dewsbury. In the Challenge Cup he scored a try and kicked four goals against York City. Southernwood kicked a goal in the loss to Halifax. He kicked four goals against Barrow. He scored a try and kicked two goals against Barrow Raiders. He kicked three goals against Workington Town. Southernwood kicked five goals against Batley. He kicked four goals and a drop goal against Doncaster and he scored a try and kicked three goals against Swinton Lions. Southernwood kicked a goal against Featherstone Rovers.

Batley Bulldogs

2015
On Friday 26 September 2014, Southernwood signed a contract with Batley to play for the club beginning in 2015.

Hunslet

2018
In October 2017, Southernwood signed a one-year contract to play for Hunslet in the 2018 season.

Statistics

Genealogical information
Cain Southernwood is the son of the rugby league footballer, Graham Southernwood, and is the nephew of the rugby league footballer, Roy Southernwood.

References

External links
Hunslet profile
Hunslet RLFC profile
Batley Bulldogs profile
Profile at wakefieldwildcats.co.uk
Bulls sign star of the future Southernwood

1992 births
Living people
Batley Bulldogs players
Bradford Bulls players
Dewsbury Rams players
English rugby league players
Hunslet R.L.F.C. players
Place of birth missing (living people)
Rugby league five-eighths
Rugby league halfbacks
Southernwood family
Whitehaven R.L.F.C. players